Kaieteur News is a privately owned daily newspaper published in Guyana, South America. Kaieteur News columnists include Freddie Kissoon, Stella Ramsaroop, Adam Harris, and an anonymous columnist who goes by the nom de plume "Peeping Tom".

External links 
 Kaieteur News

Newspapers published in Guyana
English-language newspapers published in South America